Yvonne Severn (11 April 1927 in Johannesburg – 22 November 2006 in Thousand Oaks) was an American child screen actress.

Born Yvonne Diana Severn, known as "Vonnie", she was the second daughter of Dr. Clifford Brill Severn (1890-1981) and his South African wife Rachel Malherbe (1897-1984). Her parents later emigrated from South Africa to Los Angeles. She had seven siblings who were all child actors: Venetia Severn, Clifford Severn, Raymond Severn, Ernest Severn, Christopher Severn, William Severn and Winston Severn. She married Roy Haskell Shelley (1922-1999).

Yvonne Severn is most known for her film appearances in The Amazing Mrs. Holliday (1943) and, as a princess, with her sister Venetia in Tower of London (1939).

Selected filmography
 Lloyd's of London (1936) - Ann
 Tower of London (1939) - Princess
 The Earl of Chicago (1940) - Village girl
 Eagle Squadron (1942) - Child 
 The Amazing Mrs. Holliday (1943) - Orphan
 A Guy Named Joe (1943) - Elizabeth, English girl
 Maisie Goes to Reno (1944) released in UK as You Can't Do That to Me - Eunice Jenks

References

External links
 
 

1927 births
2006 deaths
20th-century American actresses
Actresses from Los Angeles
American film actresses
South African emigrants to the United States
21st-century American women